Van Dalen is a Dutch toponymic surname meaning "from/of Dalen", a town in the province of Drenthe. Variant spellings are "Van Daalen" and Van Daelen. The name sometimes may be a hypercorrection of the form Van Dale, with the meaning "from (the) valley". Notable people with the surname include:

Van Dalen
 Cornelis van Dalen (1885–1953), Dutch sports shooter
 Dirk van Dalen (born 1932), Dutch mathematician and historian
  (1888–1967), Dutch pianist, composer and publisher
 Jan van Dalen (fl. 1632–1670), Flemish painter
 Jeanine van Dalen (born 1986), Dutch football defender
 Leon van Dalen (born 1979), Dutch football midfielder
 Lucy van Dalen (born 1988), New Zealand middle-distance runner
 Patricia van Dalen (born 1955), Venezuelan artist
 Peter van Dalen (born 1958), Dutch Christian Union politician
 Pieter van Dalen (born 1966), South African politician

Van Daalen
 Constantijn van Daalen (1884–1931), Dutch gymnast

 [[Frederick van Daalen (2008-2069), famous British Schoolboy

  (1822–1879), Royal Dutch East Indies kolonel
 Gotfried Coenraad Ernst van Daalen (1863–1930), Lieutenant General of the Royal Dutch East Indies 
 Maria van Daalen (born 1950), pseudonym of Dutch poet and writer Maria de Rooij
Van Daelen
 (born 1989), Dutch volleyball player
Van Dale
 Anton van Dale (1638–1708), Dutch Mennonite preacher, physician and writer 
 Danick Vandale (born 1992), Canadian racing cyclist
 Johan Hendrik van Dale (1838–1872), Dutch teacher, archivist, and lexicographer (creator of the Van Dale dictionary)
 Leah Van Dale (born 1987), American professional wrestler, dancer and model

See also
Van Dale, leading dictionary of the Dutch language
Van Daele, Flemish surname
Van Daalen River, river in Western New Guinea

References

Dutch-language surnames
Surnames of Dutch origin
Toponymic surnames